State Route 135 (SR 135) is part of Maine's system of numbered state highways, located entirely within Kennebec County. It runs from SR 132 in Monmouth passing U.S. Route 202 (US 202) in Winthrop and ending at the intersection with SR 8 and SR 11 at Belgrade.

Junction list

References

External links

Floodgap Roadgap's RoadsAroundME: Maine State Route 135

135
Transportation in Kennebec County, Maine